Christian Heller (born 25 May 1964) is a Swedish sports shooter. He competed in two events at the 1984 Summer Olympics.

References

External links
 

1964 births
Living people
Swedish male sport shooters
Olympic shooters of Sweden
Shooters at the 1984 Summer Olympics
Sportspeople from Uppsala
20th-century Swedish people
21st-century Swedish people